Bechu Kurian Thomas is an Indian judge who is presently serving as a judge of Kerala High Court.

Early life and education
Bechu Kurian was born at Kottayam as the second son of Justice K. T. Thomas and Susan Tharuni Thomas. He has completed his schooling from Corpus Christi School, Kottayam, St. Joseph's Boys' Higher Secondary School, Kozhikode and St. Aloysius Higher Secondary School, Quilon, pre degree from Government Arts College, Thiruvananthapuram and obtained law degree from Government Law College, Ernakulam securing 1st rank in the University in 1992 and was awarded with Annamma Kunjacko Memorial Gold Medal.

Career
Bechu Kurian enrolled in 1992 and started practicing as a lawyer at Kottayam. He shifted to Ernakulam in 1995 and started practicing in various courts including Supreme Court of India, High Court of Kerala, National Company Law Appellate Tribunal, National Green Tribunal etc. He specialised in the fields of Constitutional law, Administrative law, Taxation laws, Corporate law, Arbitration, Environmental laws, Civil Law, Criminal law, and Maritime law. In 1997 he received British Council Chevening Scholarship and underwent study and training in English Commercial Law and Practice at the College of Law, York and at Hammond Suddards, London. He started his office Bechu Kurian & Co at Ernakulam in 1998. He served as law reporter of Kerala Law Journal from 1997 to 2002. He served as standing counsel for Kerala University from 2014 to 2015. In 2015 he was designated as Senior Advocate by Kerala High Court. 6 March 2020 he was appointed as additional judge of Kerala High Court and became permeant judge with effect from 28.05.2021.

Notable rulings

Child sexual abuse laws in India
In August 2022, bench of Justice Thomas, while hearing a bail plea in a sexual offence under Protection of Children from Sexual Offenses Act, 2012, expressing the concern and quoting Erin's Law, the first law passed in the United States requiring sexual abuse prevention education to be taught to students in school every year, issued guidelines and directions to the Government of Kerala and Central Board of Secondary Education to introduce a Prevention-Oriented Program on Sexual Abuse in the curriculum from the next academic year.

References

External links
 High Court of Kerala

Living people
Judges of the Kerala High Court
21st-century Indian judges
1968 births
Indian judges